Crown Mountain is located on the island of Saint Thomas, U.S. Virgin Islands and is the highest point of the United States Virgin Islands.

See also
Geography of the United States Virgin Islands
List of mountain peaks of the United States
List of U.S. states by elevation

References

Mountains of the United States Virgin Islands
Saint Thomas, U.S. Virgin Islands